Ain is a common Estonian-language male given name.

People named Ain include:
 Ain Andressoo (born 1935), Estonian archer and architect
 Ain Anger (born 1971), Estonian opera bass
 Ain Evard (born 1962), Soviet/Estonian high jumper 
 Ain-Alar Juhanson (born 1976), Estonian triathlete
 Ain Kaalep (born 1926), Estonian poet, playwright, literary critic and translator
 Ain Kalmus (1906–2001), Estonian writer and theologian
 Ain Lutsepp (born 1954), Estonian actor and politician
 Ain Mäeots (born 1971), Estonian actor and director
 Ain Mäesalu (born 1955), Estonian archeologist
 Ain Matvere (1967–2018), Estonian badminton player
 Ain-Ervin Mere (1903–1969), Estonian military officer
 Ain Padrik (born 1947), Estonian architect
 Ain Prosa (born 1967), Estonian director and actor
 Ain Roost (born 1946), Canadian discus thrower of Estonian origin
 Ain Saar (born 1968), Estonian freedom fighter
 Ain Saarmann (born 1939), Estonian politician
 Ain Seppik (born 1952), Estonian politician
 Ain Sillak (Alfred Schmidt, 1898–1972), Estonian weightlifter
 Ain Tammus (born 1969), Estonian footballer and coach
 Ain Vilde (born 1942). Estonian ice yachter and sport sailor

References

Estonian masculine given names